Eglat Faisal is a district in south-west Qatar, located in the municipality of Al Rayyan.

Nearby settlements include Abu Samra to the south and Umm Al Jaratheem to the north-east.

Etymology
"Eglat" originates from the Arabic "oqlat", meaning "shallow well". The second part, "Faisal", is the name of the man who built the well. This well was so important that its name was extended to the entire area, which also included a farm.

References

Populated places in Al Rayyan